Soheyl may refer to:
 Soheyl, Isfahan
 Soheyl, Markazi
 Soheyl, Sistan and Baluchestan